The Qatari Emiri Navy (Arabic: البحرية الأميري القطرية romanized: Al-Bahriyah Al-Amiriyah Al-Qatariyah) (QEN), also called the Qatari Emiri Naval Forces (QENF), is the naval branch of the armed forces of the State of Qatar.

History
The State of Qatar did not possess any ships originally upon gaining independence from the United Kingdom in 1971, but by 1992 the country's armed forces had grown considerably, and included a navy of about 700 personnel. Three La Combattante III missile boats from France formed the core of the Qatari fleet in the 1990s, later seeing the addition of six Vosper Thornycroft large patrol boats. By 2010, it increased in size to about 1,800 personnel, and has taken part in multiple naval exercises with the United States Navy and other countries.

Organization
Unable to support a large military, Qatar relies on a smaller mobile force that can quickly repel incursions into its territorial waters. However, the Iran–Iraq War saw attacks on shipping just outside the country's territorial waters, underscoring its vulnerability. Despite the expansion, the Qatar Emiri Navy remains too under-manned, under-trained, and under-equipped to be able to effectively defend its waters as well as the commercial assets in it. The Qatar Navy includes its coast guard, marine police and coastal artillery.

Ship and equipment of Qatari Emiri Navy 
The current fleet of the Qatari Emiri Navy is as follows:

Minor patrol forces
 4 Vosper patrol boats    120 tons full load 
 6 Vosper 110 ft. class PCs  
 6 Damen Polycat 1,450 class PCs
 2 Keith Nelson type 44 ft.class PCs
 2 Fairey Marine Interceptor class PCs  
 4 MV-45 class PCs
 25 Fairy Marine Spear class  
 5 P-1500 class PCs
 4 DV-15 class PCs
 3 Helmatic M-160 class PCs

Special maritime forces
 11 fast interceptor boats

Auxiliary
 2 Halmatic (Vosper Thornycroft) Pilot craft
 4 Rotrork craft

Missiles and equipment
 4 × Oto Melara 76 mm Compact-weapon system 
 MBDA Exocet MM40 Block-III (x70)\ MM-40 (x220)\ MM-38 SSMs 
 MBDA Mistral SAMs 
 4 × Goalkeeper anti missile\aircraft gun 
 4 × Stingeo ship sensor 
 4 × Exocet coast defense batteries 
 4 × MMR-3D Radar

Future acquisitions
The patrol boat program calls for the delivery of six patrol boats with the first unit beginning construction in 2012 and being delivered by 2014. Although the proposals for the corvette program are due in the near-term as well, AMI believes that the four corvettes may not begin construction for several more years as Damen/Nakilat may want to gain some experience with the smaller 62-meter patrol boat hulls prior to moving on the larger Sigma hulls. If the QENF wishes to move the corvette program forward to an earlier date, it could start some of the hull blocks at Nakilat and/or at Damen in the Netherlands much earlier.

The Qatar Coast Guard Services placed an order for 17 new fast patrol boats from the Turkish company ARES Shipyard. The deal of 17 vessels consists in ten "ARES 110 Hercules" multi-role patrol craft 117 tons, five "ARES 75 Hercules" multi-role patrol craft 58 tons and two "ARES 150 Hercules" multi-role patrol craft 245 tons. These fast patrol boats will be constructed using advanced composite materials and are expected to be completed within the next five years.

On March 31, 2014, Nakilat Damen Shipyards Qatar (NDSQ) and Qatar Armed Forces signed two MoUs for the construction of seven vessels at Qatar's premier shipyard ($851 million). The MoUs signed by NDSQ and Qatar Armed Forces concern six -long axe-bow high-speed patrol vessels and one -long diving support vessel for the Qatar Armed Forces. The diving support vessel includes decompression capabilities. A large Integrated Logistic Support package is also mentioned in the MoUs.

On June 16, 2016, Qatar has signed a letter of agreement with Italian shipyard Fincantieri to build:
 1 landing helicopter dock (similar to the Fincantieri-built ;
 4 Doha class corvettes (3,250 tons) with a helicopter deck and hangar. Weapons: 1 Oto Melara 76 mm, two 30 mm guns, 16-cell VLS for Aster 30 surface-to-air missiles, 8 Exocet MM40 Block III anti-ship missiles, and a RAM launcher with 21 RIM-116 short range rolling airframe missiles. First keel laid by Fincantieri in November 2018.
 2 offshore patrol boats (670 tons). Weapons: 1 Oto Melara 76 mm, 2 30 mm guns, 8-cell VLS for VL MICA short range surface-to-air missiles and 4 Exocet MM40 Block III anti-ship missiles.

The deal has a worth of €4.9 billion.

On December 19, 2017, the Qatari Navy was said to be going ahead with plans to reinforce its underwater capabilities including the possibility of acquiring light submarines.

The Qatar Emiri Naval Forces have ordered two cadet training ships (CTS) from Turkish shipbuilder Anadolu Shipyard. According to Anadolu Shipyard, the vessels will displace 1,950 tonnes and feature a helipad for a medium-size helicopter. The vessels are also set to be capable of performing offshore patrol duties.

In February 2020, Qatar had a memorandum of understanding (MoU) with Italian defense company Fincantieri, to acquire submarines and aircraft carriers, based on a 5-billion-euro deal signed in 2017.

References

External links
 Rank insignia of the Qatari Emiri Naval Forces 

Military of Qatar
Qatar